Georg Waldvogel (born 7 July 1961) is a German ski jumper. He competed in the normal hill and large hill events at the 1984 Winter Olympics.

References

External links
 

1961 births
Living people
German male ski jumpers
Olympic ski jumpers of West Germany
Ski jumpers at the 1984 Winter Olympics
People from Breisgau-Hochschwarzwald
Sportspeople from Freiburg (region)